Giselastraße is a Munich U-Bahn station located in the Munich borough of Schwabing-West. It services both the U3 and U6 subway lines. The station is located underneath Leopoldstraße, one of Munich's main traffic arteries.

Name 
The station is named after the nearby Giselastraße, running from Leopoldstraße eastward towards the Englischer Garten. The stretch of Ludwigstraße between Universität station at Siegestor in the south and Münchner Freiheit in the north as well as its side streets are part of Munich's Schwabing bar scene (although the "real" cliché Schwabing is actually part of the borough of Maxvorstadt, along Türkenstraße and Schellingstraße, east of the university.)

Places nearby 
 Siegestor
 Englischer Garten

References

External links

Munich U-Bahn stations
Railway stations in Germany opened in 1971
1971 establishments in West Germany